Doylestown Airport  is a public airport in Bucks County, Pennsylvania, owned by the Bucks County Airport Authority (BCAA). It is two nautical miles north of Doylestown, Pennsylvania and has a single fixed-base operator, Leading Edge Aviation, Civil Air Patrol squadron 907, flight training, and aircraft rentals.

History 
The airport was founded in May 1942 as a dual use airport and farm. Between 1957 and 1960, the airport was converted from a pig farm that was owned and managed by John Van Sant, a popular aviator in Pennsylvania and founder of the Van Sant Airport. John Van Sant led the development of Vansant airport after the Bucks County Airport Authority purchase of Doylestown Airport in 1962. The airport has been continually managed by the Bucks County Airport Authority (BCAA).

Facilities
Its one runway, 5/23, is asphalt 3,002 by 60 feet (916 x 18 m).

As of 27 January 2022, the airport had an average of 72,635 aircraft operations per year, 119 per day: 69% local general aviation, 24% transient general aviation, 7% air taxi and <1% military. 136 aircraft are based at the airport: 122 single-engine, 11 multi-engine, 2 helicopter, and 1 glider.

Expansion proposals 
As of 2005, proposals to extend the single runway at Doylestown Airport were being debated. The BCAA project includes a new FBO terminal, extension the runway by 800 feet, and winding of the airport boundaries. More hangars are also recommended to allow for 25 to 100 more aircraft to be stored. Many residents nearby are against such expansions, as they fear it will encourage noisy jets. In hopes to gain public support the airport has agreed to set aside a significant portion of its land for recreational space. If approved, the 800 foot extension, 25+ aircraft hangar spaces, and other improvements will cost $26.9 million.

In 2017 commissioners voted unanimously in favor to secure a $660,000 loan to the Bucks County Airport Authority. The airport will be borrowing funs to purchase property adjacent to the airport in Buckingham, containing wooded land and a barn. A chairman stated the county is looking to add a terminal and additional parking in this space.

References

External links 
 Official website
 Doylestown Airport webcam
 Doylestown Airport (DYL) at PennDOT Bureau of Aviation
 

Airports in Pennsylvania
County airports in Pennsylvania
Transportation buildings and structures in Bucks County, Pennsylvania